The Daily American was an American daily newspaper in West Frankfort, Illinois, in operation from March 1920 until March 2015.

In 1987, the paper was acquired by Hollinger. Former owner GateHouse Media purchased roughly 160 daily and weekly newspapers from Hollinger in 1997. GateHouse also owns The Benton Evening News, another daily covering Franklin County, Illinois. On April 1, 2015, Gatehouse Media announced that the Daily American would cease publication the week of May 10, 2015, ending nearly a century of providing local and national news to the residents of the West Frankfort area.

References

External links 
 
 GateHouse Media

Defunct newspapers published in Illinois
Companies based in Franklin County, Illinois
Newspapers established in 1920
Gannett publications
Publications disestablished in 2015
1920 establishments in Illinois
2015 disestablishments in Illinois